Hilton of Cadboll, or simply Hilton, is a village about  southeast of Tain in Easter Ross, in the Scottish council area of Highland. It is famous for the Hilton of Cadboll Stone.

Hilton of Cadboll, Balintore, and Shandwick are known collectively as the Seaboard Villages.

References

External links
"Seaboard History Website'' - online archive of the social history of the Seaboard Villages; Hilton, Balintore, and Shandwick

Down to the Sea - online version of history book of Hilton, Balintore, and Shandwick

Populated places in Ross and Cromarty